Expedition of Abu Sufyan ibn Harb or the Demolition of al-Lat, occurred in the same year as the Battle of Tabuk (which occurred in October 630 AD ). Muhammad sent Abu Sufyan with a group armed men to destroy the Idol Allāt (also referred to as al-Tagiyyah) that was worshipped by the citizens of Taif. The destruction of the idol was a demand by Muhammad before any reconciliation could take place with the citizens of Taif.The event is also mentioned in the Quran verse 17:73.

Quran 17:73

According to the Muslim scholar Al-Suyuti, the Quran verse 17:73 was "revealed" about this event, after the tribe asked Muhammad to be excused from the daily prayers

Islamic primary sources

Quran
The event is mentioned in the Quran (according to al-Suyuti):

Al Suyuti's commentary on the verse is as follows:

Early Muslim sources
The event is mentioned by the Muslim jurist Tabari (he refers to al-Lat as Tagiyyah, which is an alternate name). He wrote:

See also
Military career of Muhammad
List of expeditions of Muhammad

References

630
630s conflicts
Campaigns ordered by Muhammad
Al-Lat
Destruction of religious buildings and structures